Acrioceras is an extinct genus of cephalopods belonging to the ammonite subclass.

Description 

A spire of one or two loosely coiled whorls followed by a short or long, straight or curved shaft, terminal hook, and short and or long final shaft. The ribs are generally fine and untuberculate, but sometimes the major ribs are enlarged and are carrying one to three tubercles. The ribs are single on the spire or the shaft but may branch from umbilical tubercles on the hook and the final shaft. The dorsum tends to become flat and the dorsolateral margin to become angular on the shaft and the hook.

Distribution 
Fossils of Acrioceras have been found in:
 Barremian Formation,  Brestak, Bulgaria
 Ono Formation, California
 Paja Formation, Colombia
 Barremian Provence, France
 Georgia
 Subway Formation, Germany
 Maiolica Formation, Italy
 Ishido and Inagoe Formations, Japan
 San Lucas Formation, Mexico
 Taboulouart Formation, Morocco
 Hauterivian Slovakia
 Makatini Formation, South Africa
 Hauterivian Murcia, Spain

References

External links 
 
 

Ancyloceratina
Ammonitida genera
Barremian life
Hauterivian life
Ammonites of Africa
Cretaceous Morocco
Fossils of Morocco
Ammonites of Asia
Fossils of Japan
Early Cretaceous ammonites of Europe
Cretaceous France
Fossils of France
Cretaceous Germany
Fossils of Germany
Cretaceous Italy
Fossils of Italy
Fossils of Slovakia
Cretaceous Spain
Fossils of Spain
Early Cretaceous ammonites of North America
Cretaceous California
Fossils of the United States
Cretaceous Mexico
Fossils of Mexico
Ammonites of South America
Cretaceous Colombia
Fossils of Colombia
Paja Formation
Fossil taxa described in 1900